Luk Siu-fung is a Hong Kong television series adapted from Gu Long's Lu Xiaofeng novel series. It was first broadcast on TVB in Hong Kong in 1976.

Seasons
Each season has 10 episodes, making 30 episodes in total.

 Part 1: Mystery of the Golden Bird (金鵬之迷)
 Part 2: Before and After the Duel (決戰前後)
 Part 3: The Battle of Wudang (武當之戰)

Cast
 Note: Some of the characters' names are in Cantonese romanisation.

 Damian Lau as Luk Siu-fung
 Wong Wan-choi as Fa Mun-lau
 Wong Yuen-sun as Sai-mun Chui-suet
 Ma Kim-tong as Si-hung Chak-sing
 Adam Cheng as Yip Ku-sing
 Wong Hang-sau as Sun Sau-ching
 Kwan Hoi-san as Tuk-ku Yat-hok / Lei Yin-pak
 Ho Ka-wai as Shek Sau-wan
 Ko Miu-see as Ma Sau-chan
 Chan Fuk-sang as Yip Sau-chu
 Mary Hon as Sheung-koon Fei-yin / Sheung-koon Dan-fung
 Chong Man-ching as Sheung-koon Suet-yee
 Ng Tung as Fok Yau
 Kwan Chung as Fok Tin-ching
 Kam Hing-hin as Lau Yu-han
 Lok Kung as Golden Bird King
 Kong To as Chu Ting
 Ching Ho-wai as Mrs Chu
 Ho Kwong-lun as Soul-taking Hook
 Lau Kok-sing as Iron-faced Judge
 Tsui Kwong-lam as Tuk-ku Fong
 Leung Hon-fai as Siu Chau-yu
 Bak Man-biu as Ma Hang-hung
 Kong Ngai as Yin Tit-san
 Law Ho-kai as So Siu-hing
 Law Kok-wai as San Sai-ngan
 Wong Sun as Koo Ching-fung
 Cho Kai as Hunter
 Wen Liumei as Liu QingQing

Music

From parts 1 & 2
Luk Siu-Fung is an album released by Crown Records (娛樂) in 1976. Adam Cheng records most of the songs; Teresa Cheung sings tracks 3, 5, and 6. Side one contains theme songs from the television series. Side two is unrelated to the television series except the final track.

"Yuen kwan saam gei cheui" (願君心記取) was one of the top ten songs awarded by RTHK in the 1978 awards

From part 3
These songs are heard in part three of the television series. They are sung by Adam Cheng, were written by James Wong, and composed by Joseph Koo. They are also available in the 1978 album The Heaven Sword and Dragon Saber (倚天屠龍記).
 Main theme: "Pledge to Join the War" (誓要入刀山 sai yiu yaap dou saan)
 One of the top ten "gold songs" awarded by RTHK
 Sub-theme: "Unfulfilled Sentiments" (情未了 ching mei liu)

Film
Chivalry of Conspiracy (A.K.A. Lu Hsiao Fury 陸小鳳與西門吹雪. ) Is a 1979 Film was released in Taiwan And Hong kong.

References

External links
 

1970s Hong Kong television series
1976 Hong Kong television series debuts
1976 Hong Kong television series endings
TVB dramas
Hong Kong wuxia television series
Works based on Lu Xiaofeng (novel series)
Cantonese-language television shows
Television shows based on works by Gu Long